The SDL MPEG library was developed by Loki Software. It follows the MPEG-1 standard rather than MPEG-2 because MPEG-2 is restricted by software patents in the United States of America. It uses the LGPL.

External links 
 Old SMPEG Website
 Current SMPEG Website
 dumpmpeg  - a program to dump frames from mpeg movies (still in beta state)

Application programming interfaces
Simple DirectMedia Layer